The Taiwan International Ports Corporation (TIPC) is a state-owned shipping company in Taiwan that operates ports in Taiwan.

History
The company was founded on Thursday 1 March 2012.

Organizational structure
 Public Affairs Department
 Legal Affairs Department
 Secretariat Department
 Accounting Department
 Civil Service Ethics Department
 Human Resources Department
 Harbor Crags Operation Department
 Construction Management/Engineering Department
 Occupational Safety Department
 Information Technology Department
 Finance Department
 Marketing and Logistics Department
 Port Business Department
 Planning and Development Department

Ports
 Port of Keelung
 Port of Kaohsiung
 Port of Taichung
 Port of Hualien
 Port of Taipei
 Port of Su'ao
 Port of Anping

Transportation
TIPC headquarter office is accessible within walking distance South of Kaohsiung Station of Taiwan Railways.

See also
 List of companies of Taiwan

References

External links
 

Government-owned companies of Taiwan
Taiwanese companies established in 2012
Transportation companies of Taiwan
Companies based in Kaohsiung
Port authorities